Mathias Lambrecht (1539–1602) was the third bishop of Bruges.

Life
Lambrecht was born at Sint-Laureins in the Brugse Vrije around 1539. On 7 January 1569 he graduated Licentiate of Sacred Theology at Leuven University. Thereafter he taught theology at Park Abbey and was appointed a canon of Bruges cathedral, where he became penitentiary in 1571 and archdeacon in 1588, as well as rural dean of the deanery of Damme.

During the disturbances of the Dutch Revolt he took refuge in Walloon Flanders, first at Douai and later at Saint-Omer. He returned to Bruges after the city returned to Habsburg rule in 1584.

After the death of Remi Drieux, the second bishop of Bruges, Lambrecht was appointed his successor. He was consecrated bishop in Leuven on 28 July 1596 by Mathias Hovius, archbishop of Mechelen, and was installed in Bruges on 15 August 1596. He died on 1 June 1602, and was buried in the choir of his cathedral.

Writings

Drafts of his letters to cardinals Borghese, Mattei and Baronius, written on 15 February 1602, were published in 1941. His books include:
 D'leven, doot, ende lijden der Heyligen (2 vols., Leuven, Jan Bogaert, 1590)
 Historia Ecclesiastica. Oft een kerckelijcke  historie (Antwerp, Hieronymus Verdussen, 1595); dedicated to the city government of Bruges.
 A revised edition with a continuation by Aubert Miraeus was published in 1609.
 Un traité de l'Antéchrist (1602)

References

1539 births
1602 deaths
Old University of Leuven alumni
Academic staff of the Old University of Leuven
Bishops of Bruges
16th-century Roman Catholic bishops in the Holy Roman Empire
People from Sint-Laureins